Gambia national under-20 football team is the U-20 football team of the Gambia and is controlled by the Gambia Football Federation. It serves as the youth team and feeder team of the Gambia national football team. The are nicknamed The Young Scorpions.

Home stadium 
Independence Stadium is a multi-purpose stadium in Bakau, Gambia. It is currently used mostly for football matches, although it is also used for music concerts, political events, trade fairs and national celebrations. The stadium holds 30,000 people.

Honours 
 African Youth Championship:
 Bronze Medalists (2): 2007, 2021 
 WAFU Zone A U-20 Tournament:
 Winners (2): 2018, 2020
 Bronze Medalists (1): 2019

Current squad 

Head coach: Mattar M'Boge

See also 

 Gambia national football team
 Gambia women's national football team

References 
Gambia national football team
African national under-20 association football teams

External links 

 GFF Official federation website
GFF- Young Scorpions